Reia may refer to:

Rhea (mythology)
Reia, Mozambique
Reia (programming language)